Tullio Forgiarini (born 1966) is a Luxembourgian writer. He was born in Neudorf, Luxembourg to an Italian father and a Luxembourgian mother. He studied history in Luxembourg and Strasbourg, and works as a teacher at the Lycée du Nord in Wiltz, Luxembourg.

Forgiarini has written several novels. His book Amok. Eng Lëtzebuerger Liebeschronik (Amok. A Luxembourg love story) won the EU Prize for Literature in 2013.

References

1966 births
Luxembourgian writers
Living people